Proutia norvegica is a species of moth belonging to the family Psychidae.

It is native to Northern Europe.

Synonym:
 Anaproutia norvegica (Heylaerts, 1882) 2011

References

Psychidae
Moths described in 1882